Klara Perić (born 30 March 1998) is a Croatian volleyball player. She plays as setter for Croatian club HAOK Mladost.

International career 
She is a member of the Croatia women's national volleyball team. She competed at the 2016 FIVB Volleyball Women's Club World Championship, and 2021 Women's European Volleyball League, winning a silver medal.

References

External links
Klara Perić at CEV.eu

1998 births
Living people
Croatian women's volleyball players
Sportspeople from Vinkovci
Expatriate volleyball players in Italy
Expatriate volleyball players in Spain
Expatriate volleyball players in Slovenia
Expatriate volleyball players in Finland